Marie Josephine Leopoldine Bracken (October 3, 1876 – March 15, 1902) was the common-law wife of Philippine nationalist José Rizal during his exile in Dapitan in the province of Zamboanga del Norte in the southern Philippines. In the early morning hours of December 30, 1896, the day of his execution by firing squad, the couple were married in Fort Santiago, the place of his incarceration, following his reconciliation with the Catholic Church. The marriage is disputed by some sectors because no records were found regarding the union, discounting the unusual events of that day, even if it was attested by Bracken herself and the officiating priest.

Biography

Early life

Bracken was born in Victoria Barracks in Hong Kong on October 3, 1876, to Irish parents James Bracken, a corporal in the British Army, and Elizabeth Jane McBride, who were married on May 3, 1868, in Belfast, Ireland. After her mother died shortly after childbirth, her father gave her up for adoption. She was taken in by her godfather, the American George Taufer, a blind, and fairly well-to-do engineer of the pumping plant of the Hong Kong Fire Department, and his late Portuguese wife. Taufer later remarried another Portuguese woman from Macau, Francesca Spencer, with whom he had another daughter.

In 1891, the second Mrs. Taufer died and the two young women managed the Taufer home.

After on, Taufer decided to remarry again but the new wife turned out to be difficult to deal with for Bracken. She spent two months in the Convent of the Canossian Sisters, where she previously attended early years of school. She decided to go back only after Taufer called at the convent's door pleading her to go back home as his third wife turned out to be a bad housekeeper. Shortly after a few months, she had trouble again with the third Mrs. Taufer and haunted her out of the house.

Relationship with Rizal

Bracken later recommended that her blind adoptive father see José Rizal, who was a respected ophthalmologist and had practiced at Rednaxela Terrace in Hong Kong. By this time, he was a political exile in Dapitan, Zamboanga del Norte in southern Philippines. The family sailed to the Philippines and arrived in Manila on February 5, 1895, and later that month Bracken and Taufer sailed to Dapitan.

Taufer's double cataract was beyond Rizal's help, but he fell in love with Bracken. Taufer vehemently opposed the union, but finally yielded. Bracken accompanied Taufer to Manila on his way back to Hong Kong, together with Rizal's sister, Narcisa, on March 14, 1895.  Rizal applied for marriage but because of his writings and political stance, the local priest Father Obach, would only agree to the ceremony if Rizal obtain permission from the Bishop of Cebu. Either the Bishop did not write him back or Rizal was not able to mail the letter because of Taufer's sudden departure.

Before heading back to Dapitan to live with Rizal, Bracken introduced herself to members of his family in Manila. His mother suggested a civil marriage, which she believed to be a lesser "sacrament" but free from hypocrisy—and thus less a burden to Rizal's conscience—than making any sort of political retraction. Nevertheless, Bracken and Rizal lived together as husband and wife in Barangay Talisay, Dapitan, beginning in July 1895. The couple had a son, Francisco Rizal y Bracken, who was born prematurely and died within a few hours of birth.

While she was in a delicate condition, Rizal played a prank on her that was harmless in itself, which startled her so that she sprang forward and was struck against an iron stand. Though it was purely an accident and Rizal was scarcely at fault, he blamed himself for it, and his later devotion seems largely to have been trying to make amends.

Rizal's last days

On the evening before his execution on December 30, 1896 on charges of treason, rebellion and sedition by the Spanish colonial government, the Catholic Church claimed that Rizal returned to the faith and was married to Bracken in a religious ceremony officiated by Father Vicente Balaguer, S.J. sometime between 5:00 AM and 6:00 AM, an hour before his scheduled execution at 7:00 AM. Despite claims by Father Balaguer and Bracken herself, some sectors, including members of Rizal's family, disputed that the wedding had occurred because no records were found attesting to the union.

After Rizal's death

Following Rizal's death, Bracken joined revolutionary forces in Cavite province, where she took care of sick and wounded soldiers, boosting their morale, and helping operate reloading jigs for Mauser cartridges at the Imus Arsenal under revolutionary general Pantaleón García. Imus was under threat of recapture, so Bracken, making her way through the thicket and mud, moved with the operation to the Cavite mountain redoubt of Maragondon. She witnessed the Tejeros Convention on March 22, 1897 before returning to Manila, and was later summoned by the Spanish Governor-General, who threatened her with torture and imprisonment if she did not leave the colony. Owing however to her adoptive father's American citizenship, she could not be forcibly deported, but Bracken voluntarily returned to Hong Kong upon the advice of the American consul in Manila.

Later life
Upon returning to Hong Kong, she once more lived in her father's house. After his death, she married Vicente Abad, a Cebuano mestizo who represented his father's tabacalera company in the British territory, on December 15, 1898. A daughter, Dolores Abad y Bracken, was born to the couple on April 17, 1900. A later testimony of Abad affirms that her mother "was already suffering from tuberculosis of the larynx," at the time of the wedding. 

Bracken died of tuberculosis on March 15, 1902, in Hong Kong and was interred at the Happy Valley Cemetery.

Inconsistencies
British historian Austin Coates allegedly found Bracken's birth certificate in Hong Kong and reported it as tampered. He claimed that she was probably the illegitimate daughter of an unknown Englishman and a Chinese mother.
American historian Austin Craig reported that Bracken returned to the Philippines and lived in Cebu with her new husband, Vicente Abad. She gave lessons in English, like she told Rizal during their last meeting, at first privately in Cebu, where one of her pupils allegedly became the first Speaker of the Philippine Assembly (Sergio Osmeña). For a while, she also taught English at the Colegio de la Inmaculada Concepción in Cebu, attested to by one of her pupils, Encarnación Bernad (1887-1969). Afterwards, Bracken worked as a government employee in public schools and at the Liceo de Manila, a school in Intramuros (which is unrelated to the present Lyceum of the Philippines University).

In popular media
Amanda Page played Josephine Bracken in Rizal sa Dapitan (1997).
Chin Chin Gutierrez portrayed Josephine in José Rizal (1998)
Lara Fabregas, played Josephine Bracken in Bayaning 3rd World (1999)
Eugene Domingo, played Josephine Bracken in Ang Babae sa Septic Tank 3: The Real Untold Story of Josephine Bracken (2019)

References

Sources
Acibo, Libert Amorganda and Galicano-Adanza, Estela (1995). "Jose P. Rizal: His Life, Works and Role in the Philippine Revolution". Rex Book Store, Manila. .

Cabrera, Rizal and Josephine, 15, 33.
Craig, Austin (1913).  "Lineage, life, and labors of José Rizal, Philippine patriot". Yonkers-on-Hudson World Book Company.
 De Pedro, J. (2005). Rizal through a glass darkly. Pasig: University of Asia and the Pacific.
Fadul, Jose A. (2008). "Encyclopedia Rizaliana: Student Edition". Lulu.com. .
Younghusband, George John (1899). "The Philippines and round about". Norwood Press, MA.

External links
 José Rizal Website
 The Life and Writings of Dr. José Rizal
 Rizal Family Tree
 
 Rizal's Creative Journal

1876 births
1902 deaths
People of the Philippine Revolution
British expatriates in the Philippines
Hong Kong people of Irish descent
20th-century deaths from tuberculosis
Tuberculosis deaths in Hong Kong